Mitrahalvøya is a 23 kilometer long peninsula in Albert I Land at Spitsbergen, Svalbard. The peninsula separates the fjord Krossfjorden and its western branch Lilliehöökfjorden from the sea.

References

Peninsulas of Spitsbergen